Yoselín Basualdo Álvarez (born 15 March 2000) is a Bolivian footballer who plays as a midfielder for CD Jorge Wilstermann and the Bolivia women's national team.

Club career
Basualdo has played for CD Jorge Wilstermann in Bolivia.

International career
Basualdo represented Bolivia at the 2020 South American Under-20 Women's Football Championship. At senior level, she played a friendly against Brazil in 2017.

References

2000 births
Living people
Women's association football midfielders
Bolivian women's footballers
Bolivia women's international footballers